The 2022–23 season is the 80th season in the history of FC Nantes and their 19th consecutive season in the top flight. The club are participating in Ligue 1, the Coupe de France, the Trophée des Champions and the UEFA Europa League. The season covers the period from 1 July 2022 to 30 June 2023.

Players

First-team squad

Reserve squad

Out on loan

Transfers

In

Out

Pre-season and friendlies

Competitions

Overall record

Ligue 1

League table

Results summary

Results by round

Matches 
The league fixtures were announced on 17 June 2022.

Coupe de France

Trophée des Champions

UEFA Europa League

Group stage 

The draw for the group stage was held on 26 August 2022.

Knockout phase

Knockout round play-offs 
The draw for the knockout round play-offs was held on 7 November 2022.

References

FC Nantes seasons
Nantes
2022–23 UEFA Europa League participants seasons